General Sir Webb Gillman,  (26 October 1870 – 20 April 1933) was a British Army general during the First World War.

Personal life
Webb Gillman was born on 26 October 1870 in Galle, Ceylon, the second son of Herbert Webb Gillman CCS and Annie née Mackwood.

On 8 February 1911 he married Caroline Grace Elizabeth Rube, the daughter of Charles Rube. They had three children: Herbert Charles Rube (1912-1970), who fought in the Second World War, was appointed a MBE and awarded the Croix de Guerre, reaching the rank of Colonel in the Royal Artillery; Catherine Anne Rube (1913-?) and Susan Elizabeth (1915-1961).

Military career
Educated at Dulwich College, Gillman was commissioned into the Royal Field Artillery in July 1889. He was promoted to lieutenant on 27 July 1892, and to captain (supernumerary to the establishment) on 9 October 1899. He served in the Second Boer War 1899–1900, where he took part in the Relief of Kimberley, and the following battles of Paardeberg (late February 1900), Poplar Grove, and Driefontein (March 1900). In late 1901 he was in Southern Nigeria, where he was attached as a staff officer to the columns taking part in the Aro-Anglo war (November 1901 to March 1902), for which he was mentioned in despatches by the officer in command as an "invaluable officer, cool and full of energy". He was also appointed a Companion of the Distinguished Service Order (DSO) for services during the war. In May 1902 he received a regular appointment as captain of the 119 Battery of the Field Artillery. He later spent time in Southern Nigeria in 1902.

He served in the First World War as a General Staff Officer in 13th Division and then as a brigadier with the Mediterranean Expeditionary Force sent to Gallipoli in 1915. He was then a major general with the British Salonika Force from 1916 to 1917 before becoming commander of 17th Indian Division in August 1917. He became Chief of General Staff for the Mesopotamian Expeditionary Force later on in 1917.

After the war he became Commandant of the Royal Military Academy, Woolwich in 1920, Inspector of Artillery at the War Office in 1924 and Master-General of the Ordnance in 1927. In 1927 he spent three months in Singapore assessing the defence capability of the Naval Base there. Finally he was appointed General Officer Commanding-in-Chief for Eastern Command in 1931; he died in office in 1933.

References

|-
 

|-
 

|-

1870 births
1933 deaths
British Army generals
British Army generals of World War I
British Army personnel of the Second Boer War
Commandants of the Royal Military Academy, Woolwich
Commanders of the Order of Saints Maurice and Lazarus
Commandeurs of the Légion d'honneur
Companions of the Distinguished Service Order
Knights Commander of the Order of St Michael and St George
Knights Commander of the Order of the Bath
People educated at Dulwich College
People from Galle
Recipients of the Order of St. Anna, 2nd class
Royal Artillery officers